Culex axillicola is a species of mosquito in the genus Culex.

Distribution
Pukamil Hamlet, Minj, Western Highlands Province, Papua New Guinea.

References

axillicola
Insects described in 1979
Diptera of Asia